The 1999 du Maurier Open doubles was the doubles event of the one hundred and tenth edition of the Canadian Open; a WTA Tier I tournament and the most prestigious women's tennis tournament held in Canada.

Martina Hingis and Jana Novotná were the defending champions, but only Hingis didn't compete this year. However, Novotná successfully defended her title, competing with Mary Pierce and defeating Larisa Neiland and Arantxa Sánchez Vicario in the final.

Seeds
The top four seeds received a bye into the second round.

Qualifying draw

Draw

Finals

Top half

Bottom half

References
 1999 du Maurier Open Women's Doubles Draw

Doubles
1999 du Maurier Open